Harbor High School may refer to:

 Harbor High School (Ohio) in Ashtabula, Ohio
 Harbor High School (California) in Santa Cruz, California
 Harbor High School (Washington) in Aberdeen, Washington

See also
Har-Ber High School in Springdale, Arkansas